To Be a Millionaire is a 1980 Swedish comedy film directed by Mats Arehn. The film won the Guldbagge Award for Best Film at the 16th Guldbagge Awards.

Cast
 Eddie Axberg as Jens Fors
 Olof Bergström as Bengt Sundelin
 Brasse Brännström as Jan Olsson
 Allan Edwall as Persson
 Gösta Ekman as Stig
 Björn Gustafson as Bosse
 Anki Lidén as Anki
 Lis Nilheim as Anne-Marie

References

External links
 
 

1980 films
1980 comedy films
Swedish comedy films
1980s Swedish-language films
Best Film Guldbagge Award winners
Films directed by Mats Arehn
1980s Swedish films